DOOM Incorporated is an American film production company based in Los Angeles, California. The company was founded by film director and screenwriter Thomas Mignone.

History
In 2001, Mignone launched DOOM Inc. to produce the original feature films, commercials, music videos, television and web content he creates, writes and directs. The company is best known for producing The Latin From Manhattan, the dark drama On The Doll, and music videos for hard rock and heavy metal artists such as Slipknot, Mudvayne, System Of A Down, Suicide Silence, Avenged Sevenfold, Sepultura, Danzig, Cradle of Filth, Cavalera Conspiracy, Type O Negative, Megadeth, American Head Charge, Obituary, Superjoint Ritual, Fear Factory, Soulfly, Kittie, Otep, The Fall of Troy, Dia De Los Muertos, Inquisition, Death Angel, and Killer Be Killed as well as others. DOOM Inc's most recent production is a biopic about Vanessa del Rio.

Feature film production
In 2008, DOOM Inc produced the feature film On The Doll. On The Doll premiered at the Austin Film Festival and was also selected to screen at the 25th Anniversary of the Avignon Film Festival in France, Cinequest in San Jose, Fort Lauderdale International Film Festival, and the 15th Annual Oldenburg International Film Festival in Germany. The film's soundtrack features new music from The Crystal Method, and an original score from former Tool bassist Paul D'Amour. In October 2012, DOOM Inc was one of production companies selected by the Cinequest Film Festival to direct and produce a film in concurrence with their partnership with The Tech Museum of Innovation. Other feature film projects include Otep: Live Confrontation Concert Documentary, Slipknot: Welcome To Our Neighborhood, Satanika, a live-action version of the comic book female anti-hero created by multi-platinum rock musician Glenn Danzig, and The Vanessa del Rio Story.

Music video production
DOOM Inc's music video for Mudvayne's hit song "Dig" won the first MTV2 Award and was the first music video to feature heavy metal artists in vibrant, brightly lit and color-saturated images, in sharp contrast to the dark, shadowy videos typical of the genre. The company's video for Sepultura's "Roots Bloody Roots" received the Video Of The Year Award from Kerrang! Magazine. It was filmed in Salvador, Brazil, and was the first music video to contrast the hard rock group's intense performance with images of capoeira dancers, timbalada musicians, and other traditional Brazilian scenes. In addition to hard rock and heavy metal artists, DOOM Inc has also produced videos for alternative music artists such as Toadies, Tonic, Concrete Blonde, Lit, and others. It has produced hip hop and urban music videos for artists such as Kool Keith, Digable Planets, and Rahsaan Patterson. DOOM Inc's videos are characterized by strong narrative conceptual storylines, elaborate and distinct color-correction palettes, and many times include feature film actors in lead roles, including Vincent Gallo, Denise Richards, Michael Rooker, Peter Stormare, and Navi Rawat. Recent videos include "Existo Vulgore" for Morbid Angel, "Bullet Proof Heart" for Miss Derringer featuring vocalist and Los Angeles artist Elizabeth McGrath, the MTV #1 Buzz Clip video "Lay Me Down" for the Dirty Heads featuring vocalist Rome from the band Sublime, and "Wings Of Feathers And Wax" for American heavy metal supergroup Killer Be Killed featuring Soulfly/ex-Sepultura vocalist and guitarist Max Cavalera, The Dillinger Escape Plan co-vocalist and guitarist Greg Puciato, Mastodon bassist and co-vocalist Troy Sanders and former The Mars Volta drummer Dave Elitch.

Filmography
2009: On The Doll
2010: Otep Live Confrontation
2011: Slipknot Welcome To Our Neighborhood featuring Wait & Bleed, Surfacing, and Spit It Out
2013: The Tech Museum of Innovation Solar Energy Branding Campaign
2017: Vanessa del Rio Feature Film Project

References

External links
 

Film production companies of the United States